The 2012–13 Toronto Raptors season was the 18th season of the franchise in the National Basketball Association (NBA). In the off-season, after failing to obtain Steve Nash in free agency, the Raptors acquired Kyle Lowry from the Houston Rockets for a first round pick. The season also marked the debut of Jonas Valančiūnas, their first pick in the 2011 Draft from Lithuania. On January 30, 2013, the Raptors acquired Rudy Gay in a three-way deal with the Memphis Grizzlies and Detroit Pistons which sent longtime point guard José Calderón to the Pistons. Despite a winning home record (21-20) the Raptors failed to secure a playoff spot with a 34-48 record. This season also marked the official beginning of the DeRozan/Lowry era in Toronto.

The Raptors would not miss the playoffs again until 2021.

Key dates
 June 28: The 2012 NBA draft took place at Prudential Center in Newark, New Jersey.

Draft picks

Pre-season

|- style="background:#cfc;"
| 1
| October 8
| Real Madrid
| 
| DeMar DeRozan (18)
| Ed Davis (10)
| José Calderón (8)
| Air Canada Centre10,359
| 1–0
|- style="background:#fcc;"
| 2
| October 10
| @ Detroit
| 
| DeMar DeRozan (17)
| Aaron Gray (7)
| Four players (2)
| The Palace of Auburn Hills9,532
| 1–1
|- style="background:#cfc;"
| 3
| October 12
| Detroit
| 
| DeMar DeRozan (14)
| Jonas Valančiūnas (8)
| John Lucas III (8)
| Air Canada Centre10,167
| 2–1
|- style="background:#cfc;"
| 4
| October 17
| Washington
| 
| Landry Fields (15)
| Ed Davis (9)
| José Calderón (8)
| Air Canada Centre11,750
| 3–1
|- style="background:#cfc;"
| 5
| October 19
| New York
| 
| Andrea Bargnani (20)
| Jonas Valančiūnas (10)
| Landry Fields, Kyle Lowry (5)
| Bell Centre22,114
| 4–1
|- style="background:#cfc;"
| 6
| October 22
| Milwaukee
| 
| DeMar DeRozan (21)
| Jonas Valančiūnas (8)
| José Calderón, Kyle Lowry (6)
| Air Canada Centre11,364
| 5–1
|- style="background:#cfc;"
| 7
| October 26
| @ Memphis
| 
| Andrea Bargnani (21)
| Jonas Valančiūnas (7)
| José Calderón, Kyle Lowry (7)
| FedExForum10,206
| 6–1

Roster

Regular season

Game log

|- style="background:#fcc;"
| 1 || October 31 || Indiana
| 
| Kyle Lowry (21)
| Jonas Valančiūnas (10)
| Kyle Lowry (8)
| Air Canada Centre19,800
| 0–1

|- style="background:#fcc;"								
| 2 || November 3 || @ Brooklyn
| 
| Kyle Lowry (28)
| Kyle Lowry (8)
| Kyle Lowry (8)
| Barclays Center17,732
| 0-2
|- style="background:#cfc;"									
| 3 || November 4 || Minnesota
| 
| DeRozan and Lowry (22)
| DeRozan, Lowry and Davis (7)
| Kyle Lowry (5)
| Air Canada Centre16,754
| 1–2
|- style="background:#fcc;"									
| 4 || November 6 || @ Oklahoma City
| 
| Jonas Valančiūnas (18)
| Ed Davis (9)
| Lowry & Lucas (4)
| Chesapeake Energy Arena18,203
| 1–3
|- style="background:#fcc;"									
| 5 || November 7 || @ Dallas
| 
| Andrea Bargnani (25)
| Amir Johnson (11)
| DeMar DeRozan (7)
| American Airlines Center19,763
| 1–4
|- style="background:#fcc;"									
| 6 || November 10 || Philadelphia
| 
| Andrea Bargnani (23)
| Jonas Valančiūnas (8)
| José Calderón (11)
| Air Canada Centre19,800
| 1–5
|- style="background:#fcc;"									
| 7 || November 12 || Utah
| 
| DeMar DeRozan (37)
| Amir Johnson (14)
| José Calderón (17)
| Air Canada Centre18,230
| 1–6
|- style="background:#cfc;"									
| 8 || November 13 || @ Indiana
| 
| DeMar DeRozan (15)
| José Calderón (10)
| José Calderón (10)
| Bankers Life Fieldhouse11,947
| 2–6
|- style="background:#fcc;"									
| 9 || November 17 || @ Boston
| 
| Bargnani & Lucas (15)
| Ed Davis (9)
| José Calderón (9)
| TD Garden18,624
| 2–7
|- style="background:#cfc;"									
| 10 || November 18 || Orlando
| 
| DeMar DeRozan (20)
| DeMar DeRozan (9)
| José Calderón (18)
| Air Canada Centre18,702
| 3–7
|- style="background:#fcc;"									
| 11 || November 20 || @ Philadelphia	
| 
| DeMar DeRozan (24)
| Jonas Valančiūnas (11)
| José Calderón (12)
| Wells Fargo Center13,965
| 3–8
|- style="background:#fcc;"								
| 12 || November 21 || @ Charlotte
| 
| Andrea Bargnani (25)
| Jonas Valančiūnas (10)
| Kyle Lowry (8)
| Time Warner Cable Arena15,240
| 3-9
|- style="background:#fcc;"									
| 13 || November 23 || @ Detroit
| 
| Andrea Bargnani (34)
| Valančiūnas & Lowry (6)
| Kyle Lowry (5)
| The Palace of Auburn Hills12,778
| 3-10
|- style="background:#fcc;"									
| 14 || November 25 || San Antonio
| 
| DeMar DeRozan (29)
| Ed Davis (14)
| José Calderón (9)
| Air Canada Centre19,800
| 3-11
|- style="background:#fcc;"									
| 15 || November 27 || @ Houston
| 
| Andrea Bargnani (21)
| Kyle Lowry (8)
| José Calderón (7)
| Toyota Center12,907
| 3-12
|- style="background:#fcc;"									
| 16 || November 28 || @ Memphis
| 
| DeMar DeRozan (16)
| Ed Davis (6)
| Kyle Lowry (4)
| FedExForum14,603
| 3-13
|- style="background:#cfc;"									
| 17 || November 30 || Phoenix
| 
| DeMar DeRozan (23)
| DeRozan & Davis (8)
| José Calderón (9)
| Air Canada Centre18,246
| 4-13	

|- style="background:#fcc;"												
| 18 || December 3 || @ Denver
| 
| Kyle Lowry (24)
| Ed Davis (9)
| Kyle Lowry (7)
| Pepsi Center15,221
| 4-14
|- style="background:#fcc;"									
| 19 || December 5 || @ Sacramento
| 
| Kyle Lowry (34)
| Ed Davis (11)
| Kyle Lowry (11)
| Sleep Train Arena12,476
| 4-15
|- style="background:#fcc;"									
| 20 || December 7 || @ Utah	
| 
| Andrea Bargnani (20)
| Andrea Bargnani (8)
| Kyle Lowry (4)
| EnergySolutions Arena18,069
| 4-16
|- style="background:#fcc;"							
| 21 || December 9 || @ L. A. Clippers
| 
| DeMar DeRozan (24)
| Amir Johnson (8)
| Kyle Lowry (9)
| Staples Center19,060
| 4-17
|- style="background:#fcc;"									
| 22 || December 10 || @ Portland	
| 
| DeMar DeRozan (20)
| Jonas Valančiūnas (10)
| José Calderón (6)
| Rose Garden16,863
| 4-18
|- style="background:#fcc;"
| 23 || December 12 || Brooklyn
| 
| Ed Davis (24)
| Ed Davis (12)
| José Calderón (15)
| Air Canada Centre18,847
| 4-19
|- style="background:#cfc;"									
| 24 || December 14 || Dallas
| 
| Linas Kleiza (20)
| Ed Davis (8)
| John Lucas III (6)
| Air Canada Centre19,132
| 5-19
|- style="background:#cfc;"								
| 25 || December 16 || Houston
| 
| Alan Anderson (24)
| José Calderón (10)
| José Calderón (14)
| Air Canada Centre17,863
| 6-19
|- style="background:#cfc;"									
| 26 || December 18 || @ Cleveland
| 
| José Calderón (23)
| Jonas Valančiūnas (7)
| José Calderón (6)
| Quicken Loans Arena13,233
| 7-19
|- style="background:#cfc;"									
| 27 || December 19 || Detroit
| 
| DeMar DeRozan (23)
| Johnson & Davis (9)
| José Calderón (17)
| Air Canada Centre17,062
| 8-19
|- style="background:#cfc;"									
| 28 || December 21 || Orlando
| 
| DeMar DeRozan (17)
| DeMar DeRozan (8)
| José Calderón (9)
| Air Canada Centre18,391
| 9-19
|- style="background:#fcc;"									
| 29 || December 26 || @ San Antonio
| 
| Johnson & Anderson (12)
| Ed Davis (7)
| José Calderón (10)
| AT&T Center18,581
| 9-20
|- style="background:#cfc;"									
| 30 || December 28 || @ New Orleans
| 
| DeMar DeRozan (30)
| Amir Johnson (8)
| Kyle Lowry (8)
| New Orleans Arena13,968
| 10-20
|- style="background:#cfc;"									
| 31 || December 29 || @ Orlando
| 
| DeMar DeRozan (21)
| Landry Fields (9)
| José Calderón (10)
| Amway Center18,846
| 11-20	

|- style="background:#cfc;"															
| 32 || January 2 || Portland
| 
| Terrence Ross (26)
| Fields, Johnson & Davis (7)
| José Calderón (13)
| Air Canada Centre18,117
| 12-20
|- style="background:#fcc;"									
| 33 || January 4 || Sacramento
| 
| Kyle Lowry (24)
| Ed Davis (13)
| Kyle Lowry (4)
| Air Canada Centre17,824
| 12-21
|- style="background:#fcc;"									
| 34 || January 6 || Oklahoma City
| 
| Alan Anderson (27)
| Amir Johnson (9)
| José Calderón (11)
| Air Canada Centre17,634
| 12-22
|- style="background:#cfc;"									
| 35 || January 9 || Philadelphia
| 
| DeRozan & Johnson (19)
| Amir Johnson (12)
| José Calderón (11)
| Air Canada Centre15,629
| 13-22
|- style="background:#cfc;"									
| 36 || January 11 || Charlotte
| 
| Alan Anderson (16)
| Landry Fields (11)
| Calderón & Lowry (6)
| Air Canada Centre14,373
|14-22
|- style="background:#fcc;"									
| 37 || January 13 || Milwaukee	
| 
| DeMar DeRozan (23)
| Amir Johnson (14)
|José Calderón (8)
| Air Canada Centre17,384
|14-23
|- style="background:#fcc;"								
| 38 || January 15 || @ Brooklyn
| 
| Kyle Lowry (21)
| Landry Fields (11)
| Calderón & Fields
| Barclays Center16,236
| 14-24
|- style="background:#fcc;"									
| 39 || January 16 || Chicago
| 
| Alan Anderson (27)
| Amir Johnson (10)
| Kyle Lowry (7)
| Air Canada Centre18,674
| 14-25
|- style="background:#fcc;"									
| 40 || January 18 || @ Philadelphia
| 
| Anderson, Davis, Ross (18)
| Ed Davis (10)
| Kyle Lowry (11)
| Wells Fargo Center 16,574
| 14-26
|- style="background:#cfc;"									
| 41 || January 20 || L. A. Lakers
| 
| José Calderón (22)
| Landry Fields (10)
| José Calderón (9)
| Air Canada Centre 19,800
| 15-26
|- style="background:#fcc;"									
| 42 || January 23 || @ Miami
| 
| Alan Anderson (20)
| Amir Johnson (6)
| DeMar DeRozan (7)
| American Airlines Arena20,002
| 15-27
|- style="background:#cfc;"								
| 43 || January 24 || @ Orlando
| 
| DeMar DeRozan (22)
| Amir Johnson (10)
| DeMar DeRozan (7)
| Amway Center17,145
| 16-27
|- style="background:#fcc;"									
| 44 || January 26 || Cleveland
| 
| Amir Johnson (18)
| Amir Johnson (12)
| Kyle Lowry (7)
| Air Canada Centre 18,820
| 16-28
|- style="background:#fcc;"									
| 45 || January 28 || Golden State
| 
| Aaron Gray (22)
| Aaron Gray (10)
| DeMar DeRozan (9)
| Air Canada Centre15,914
|16-29
|- style="background:#fcc;"									
| 46 || January 30 || @ Atlanta	
| 
| DeMar DeRozan (23)
| Amir Johnson (14)
| Kyle Lowry (5)
| Philips Arena12,021
| 16-30	

|- style="background:#cfc;"														
| 47 || February 1 || L. A. Clippers
| 
| Rudy Gay (20)
| Amir Johnson (16)
| Kyle Lowry (8)
| Air Canada Centre 19,800
| 17-30
|- style="background:#fcc;"									
| 48 || February 3 || Miami
| 
| Rudy Gay (29)
| Aaron Gray (12)
| Anderson, DeRozan & Lowry (3)
| Air Canada Centre19,800
|17-31
|- style="background:#fcc;"
| 49 || February 6 || Boston
| 
| Rudy Gay (25)
| Gay & Johnson (12)
| Kyle Lowry (8)
| Air Canada Centre17,163
| 17-32
|- style="background:#cfc;"
| 50 || February 8 || @ Indiana
| 
| Rudy Gay (23)
| Amir Johnson (14)
| Kyle Lowry (6)
| Bankers Life Fieldhouse16,253
| 18-32
|- style="background:#cfc;"
| 51 || February 10 || New Orleans
| 
| Rudy Gay (20)
| Jonas Valančiūnas (10)
| Kyle Lowry (10)
| Air Canada Centre17,177
| 19-32
|- style="background:#cfc;"									
| 52 || February 12 || Denver
| 
| DeMar DeRozan (22)
| DeRozan & Valančiūnas (8)
| Kyle Lowry (10)
| Air Canada Centre16,738
| 20-32
|- style="background:#cfc;"									
| 53 || February 13 || @ New York
| 
| Alan Anderson (26)
| Landry Fields (10)
| Rudy Gay (4)
| Madison Square Garden19,033
| 21-32
|- align="center"
|colspan="9" bgcolor="#bbcaff"|All-Star Break
|- style="background:#cfc;"									
| 54 || February 19 || @ Washington
| 
| DeRozan & Gay (24)
| Gay & Valančiūnas (8)
| Kyle Lowry (10)
| Verizon Center13,923
| 22-32
|- style="background:#fcc;"									
| 55 || February 20 || Memphis
| 
| Alan Anderson (19)
| Rudy Gay (9)
| DeMar DeRozan (5)
| Air Canada Centre19,800
| 22-33
|- style="background:#cfc;"									
| 56 || February 22 || New York
| 
| Rudy Gay (32)
| Jonas Valančiūnas (10)
| Kyle Lowry (7)
| Air Canada Centre19,800
|23-33
|- style="background:#fcc;"									
| 57 || February 25 || Washington
| 
| DeMar DeRozan (25)
| Amir Johnson (13)
|Rudy Gay (4)
| Air Canada Centre16,705
|23-34
|- style="background:#fcc;"								
| 58 || February 27 || @ Cleveland
| 
| DeMar DeRozan (34)
| Amir Johnson (9)
| Kyle Lowry (8)
| Quicken Loans Arena13,368
| 23-35

|-style="background:#fcc;"																
| 59 || March 1 || Indiana
| 
| Rudy Gay (21)
| Jonas Valančiūnas (9)
| DeMar DeRozan (3)
| Air Canada Centre18,268
| 23-36
|- style="background:#fcc;"								
| 60 || March 2 || @ Milwaukee
| 
| Alan Anderson (21)
| Kyle Lowry (10)
| Kyle Lowry (10)
| Bradley Center16,165
| 23-37
|- style="background:#fcc;"									
| 61 || March 4 || @ Golden State
| 
| Bargnani & Gay (26)
| Amir Johnson (15)
|Kyle Lowry (9)
| Oracle Arena19,596
|23-38
|- style="background:#cfc;"									
| 62 || March 6 || @ Phoenix	
| 
| DeMar DeRozan (15)
| DeRozan & Johnson (6)
| Sebastian Telfair (7)
| US Airways Center13,173
| 24-38
|- style="background:#fcc;"								
| 63 || March 8 || @ L. A. Lakers	
| 
| DeMar DeRozan (28)
| Rudy Gay (7)
| Kyle Lowry (10)
| Staples Center18,997
| 24-39
|- style="background:#cfc;"								
| 64 || March 10 || Cleveland
| 
| Alan Anderson (18)
| Amir Johnson (16)
| DeMar DeRozan (6)
| Air Canada Centre19,800
| 25-39
|- style="background:#fcc;"								
| 65 || March 13 || @ Boston	
| 
| Rudy Gay (19)
| Rudy Gay (7)
| Rudy Gay (4)
| TD Garden18,624
| 25-40
|- style="background:#cfc;"							
| 66 || March 15 || Charlotte
| 
| Rudy Gay (28)
| Amir Johnson (21)
| Sebastian Telfair (5)
| Air Canada Centre17,514
| 26-40
|- style="background:#fcc;"									
| 67 || March 17 || Miami		
| 
| Rudy Gay (27)
| Amir Johnson (18)
| Rudy Gay (4)
| Air Canada Centre18,564
| 26-41
|- style="background:#fcc;"						
| 68 || March 20 || @ Charlotte
| 
| Rudy Gay (25)
| Amir Johnson (10)
| Kyle Lowry (5)
| Time Warner Cable Arena12,872
| 26-42
|- style="background:#fcc;"									
| 69 || March 22 || New York	
| 
| Alan Anderson (35)
| Jonas Valančiūnas (7)
| Kyle Lowry (10)
| Air Canada Centre19,800
| 26-43
|- style="background:#fcc;"							
| 70 || March 23 || @ New York
| 
| DeMar DeRozan (17)
| Jonas Valančiūnas (8)
| Kyle Lowry (4)
| Madison Square Garden19,033
| 26-44
|- style="background:#fcc;"								
| 71 || March 27 || Atlanta
| 
| Jonas Valančiūnas (19)
| Rudy Gay (12)
| Kyle Lowry (10)
| Air Canada Centre18,206
| 26-45
|- style="background:#cfc;"									
| 72 || March 29 || @ Detroit	
| 
| DeRozan & Gay (21)
| Jonas Valančiūnas (13)
| Kyle Lowry (11)
| The Palace of Auburn Hills19,322
|27-45
|- style="background:#fcc;"								
| 73 || March 31 || @ Washington
| 
| Jonas Valančiūnas (18)
| Amir Johnson (12)
| Kyle Lowry (7)
| Verizon Center14,360
| 27-46

|- style="background:#fcc;"																
| 74 || April 1 || Detroit
| 
| Rudy Gay (34)
| DeMar DeRozan (7)
| Kyle Lowry (7)
| Air Canada Centre17,115
| 27-47
|- style="background:#cfc;"									
| 75 || April 3 || Washington
| 
| DeMar DeRozan (25)
| Jonas Valančiūnas (10)
| Kyle Lowry (13)
| Air Canada Centre15,783
| 28-47
|- style="background:#cfc;"									
| 76 || April 5 || @ Minnesota	
| 
| Rudy Gay (26)
| Amir Johnson (8)
| Kyle Lowry (7)
| Target Center16,661
| 29-47
|- style="background:#fcc;"								
| 77 || April 6 || @ Milwaukee
| 
| Alan Anderson (14)
| Rudy Gay (8)
| Sebastian Telfair (7)
| Bradley Center16,746
| 29-48
|- style="background:#cfc;"									
| 78 || April 9 || @ Chicago
| 
| DeMar DeRozan (20)
| Amir Johnson (11)
| Kyle Lowry (10)
| United Center21,487
| 30-48
|- style="background:#cfc;"									
| 79 || April 12 || Chicago
| 
| Amir Johnson (24)
| Acy, Johnson & Lowry (9)
| Kyle Lowry (11)
| Air Canada Centre19,800
| 31-48
|- style="background:#cfc;"									
| 80 || April 14 || Brooklyn
| 
| DeMar DeRozan (36)
| Rudy Gay (10)
| Kyle Lowry (6)
| Air Canada Centre17,617
| 32-48
|- style="background:#cfc;"									
| 81 || April 16 || @ Atlanta
| 
| DeMar DeRozan (30)
| Amir Johnson (8)
| Kyle Lowry (11)
| Philips Arena15,200
| 33-48
|- style="background:#cfc;"								
| 82 || April 17 || Boston
| 
| DeMar DeRozan (24)
| Landry Fields (11)
| Kyle Lowry (8)
| Air Canada Centre17,690
| 34-48

Standings

References

Toronto Raptors seasons
Toronto Raptors
Tor